Stanley Jacob Kuick (April 24, 1904 – August 26, 1977) was an American football player.  He played for the Milwaukee Badgers of the n the National Football League (NFL) in 1926 as a guard.  Kuick played at the college football at Beloit College.

Biography
Kuick was born on April 24, 1904 in Kewaunee, Wisconsin.

References

1904 births
1977 deaths
American football guards
Beloit Buccaneers football players
Milwaukee Badgers players
People from Kewaunee, Wisconsin
Players of American football from Wisconsin